Martin Brest (born August 8, 1951) is an American film director, screenwriter, and producer.

Education
Brest was born in the Bronx, New York, and graduated from Stuyvesant High School in 1969, from New York University's School of the Arts in 1973 and from the AFI Conservatory with an Master of Fine Arts in 1977.

Career
His major studio debut was Going in Style (1979), which starred George Burns, Art Carney, and Lee Strasberg. Brest was then hired to direct WarGames (1983), which starred Matthew Broderick, but he was fired during production and replaced with John Badham.

Brest then directed Beverly Hills Cop (1984), starring Eddie Murphy. The film grossed over $300 million worldwide and received Golden Globe nominations for Best Motion Picture – Musical or Comedy and for Best Actor – Motion Picture Musical or Comedy, Eddie Murphy, as well as an Academy Award nomination for Best Original Screenplay.

Brest was in pre-production for Rain Man (1988), when he cast Tom Cruise in the role opposite Dustin Hoffman, before Barry Levinson eventually directed the film.

Brest's next film was the action-comedy Midnight Run (1988), starring Robert De Niro and Charles Grodin. The film was another critical and commercial success, earning Brest another Golden Globe Award nomination for Best Motion Picture, Musical or Comedy as well as a Best Actor Motion Picture – Musical or Comedy nomination for De Niro.

His work on Scent of a Woman (1992) earned him a Golden Globe Award for Best Motion Picture – Drama. The film also won Golden Globes for Al Pacino and screenwriter Bo Goldman, as well as a Best Supporting Actor nomination for Chris O'Donnell. In addition, the film received four Academy Award nominations: Best Picture, Best Director, Best Screenplay (Adapted), with Al Pacino winning Best Actor.

Brest's next film, Meet Joe Black (1998), starring Brad Pitt and Anthony Hopkins, was a loose remake of 1934's Death Takes a Holiday. The film had an American box-office return of $44.6 million, taking in an additional $98.3 million overseas for a worldwide total of $142.9 million.

Brest wrote and directed Gigli (2003), starring Ben Affleck and Jennifer Lopez. During filming, production company Revolution Studios took creative control from him, resulting in a radically re-written and re-shot version of the original film being released. That version became one of the more notorious films of its time, with a scathing critical reception. A 2014 article in Playboy observed that he appeared to have left public life entirely after Giglis release, but in 2021, he appeared as a featured guest at a screening of Beverly Hills Cop and Midnight Run in Los Angeles, where he was interviewed by fellow filmmaker Paul Thomas Anderson.

Brest has received the America Film Institute’s Franklin J. Schaffner Award, which “celebrates the recipient’s extraordinary creative talents and artistic achievements.”

His 1972 New York University student film Hot Dogs for Gauguin, starring a then unknown Danny DeVito, was one of 25 films chosen in 2009 by the National Film Registry of the Library of Congress to "be preserved as cultural, artistic and/or historical treasures".

Filmography

Awards

References

External links
 

1951 births
Living people
American film editors
Tisch School of the Arts alumni
Stuyvesant High School alumni
People from the Bronx
Film directors from New York City
AFI Conservatory alumni
Comedy film directors